Tiamulin (previously thiamutilin) is a pleuromutilin antibiotic drug that is used in veterinary medicine particularly for pigs and poultry.

Tiamulin is a diterpene antimicrobial with a pleuromutilin chemical structure similar to that of valnemulin.

References 

Pleuromutilin antibiotics
Secondary alcohols
Ketones
Carboxylate esters
Thioethers
Cyclopentanes
Diethylamino compounds
Vinyl compounds